Cooper-Grant is a neighborhood located in the northwestern part of Camden, New Jersey. According to the 2000 U.S. Census, the neighborhood has a population of 838. The neighborhood is situated near the Benjamin Franklin Bridge and Rutgers University–Camden. It is served by the Cooper Street – Rutgers University River LINE station. The neighborhood is home to the Cooper-Grant Historic District which includes 93 buildings spread over 250 acres. Cooper-Grant is considered one of the city's contemporary residential success stories. It has a relatively low-crime rate and many residents are college-educated professionals and students.

See also

National Register of Historic Places listings in Camden County, New Jersey
Cooper Library in Johnson Park
Campbell's Field
Nipper Building
Cooper Street Historic District

References

Neighborhoods in Camden, New Jersey
Historic districts on the National Register of Historic Places in New Jersey
New Jersey Register of Historic Places
Historic districts in Camden County, New Jersey